Sweden competed at the 1998 Winter Paralympics in Nagano, Japan. 24 competitors from Sweden won 6 medals, 1 silver and 5 bronze, and finished 19th in the medal table.

See also 
 Sweden at the Paralympics
 Sweden at the 1998 Winter Olympics

References 

1998
1998 in Swedish sport
Nations at the 1998 Winter Paralympics